Pavel Polakovič (born 11 January 1974) is a Slovak former professional boxer who competed from 2005 to 2016. He held the IBF International cruiserweight title in 2006. As an amateur, he won a bronze medal in the light-middleweight division while representing the Czech Republic at the 1996 European Championships in Vejle, Denmark.

Personal life
He is of Roma (Gypsy) origin.

References

 sports-reference

1974 births
Living people
Slovak male boxers
Boxers at the 1996 Summer Olympics
Olympic boxers of the Czech Republic
Czech male boxers
Heavyweight boxers
Slovak Romani people
Romani sportspeople
People from Trnava District
Sportspeople from the Trnava Region